McLaurin is a surname. Notable people with the surname include::

 Anselm J. McLaurin (1848–1909), American politician from Mississippi
 Bette McLaurin, American singer
 John L. McLaurin (1860–1934), American politician from South Carolina
 Marcus McLaurin, American comic-book writer
 Ralph McLaurin (1885–1943), American baseball player and coach
 Terry McLaurin (born 1996), American football player
 Virginia McLaurin (1909-2022), American social worker
 Colin MacLaurin (1698–1764), also spelt McLaurin, Scottish mathematician noted for the mathematical series named after him

See also
 McLaurin, Mississippi, unincorporated community, United States
 Maclaurin
 Clan MacLaren
 McLaurin v. Oklahoma State Regents, US Supreme Court Decision, 1950